Bulbophyllum aberrans, known as the deviating bulbophyllum, is a species of orchid in the genus Bulbophyllum. It is found in Borneo and Sulawesi.

References
Citations

Bibliography
The Bulbophyllum-Checklist
The Internet Orchid Species Photo Encyclopedia

aberrans